Makefu is one of the fourteen villages of Niue. Its population at the 2017 census was 70, up from 64 in 2011.

The village was established by villagers from Tuapa.

References

Populated places in Niue